Zerbst is a town in the district of Anhalt-Bitterfeld, in Saxony-Anhalt, Germany. Until an administrative reform in 2007, Zerbst was the capital of the former Anhalt-Zerbst district.

Geography

With the 1 January 2010 local government reform, the 21 formerly independent communities of the disbanded Verwaltungsgemeinschaft (municipal association) Elbe-Ehle-Nuthe were incorporated into the town. The current municipal area stretches from the Elbe in the southwest up to the Fläming Heath and the state border with Brandenburg in the northeast.

Divisions 
The town Zerbst consists of Zerbst proper and the following 24 Ortschaften or municipal divisions:

Bias
Bornum
Buhlendorf
Deetz
Dobritz
Gehrden
Gödnitz
Grimme
Güterglück
Hohenlepte
Jütrichau
Leps
Lindau
Luso
Moritz
Nedlitz
Nutha
Polenzko
Pulspforde
Reuden
Steutz
Straguth
Walternienburg
Zernitz

History
In the 8th century the area east of the Elbe was settled by Polabian Slavs (Sorbs). Part of the border region with the adjacent Saxon region around Magdeburg in the west, it was incorporated into the Gau Ciervisti of the Saxon Eastern March (Marca Geronis) about 937 in the course of the German Ostsiedlung.

It is not clear when Zerbst was founded; however, the name Ciervisti mentioned as early as 949 may already refer to a fortified Slavic settlement. The chronicles by Prince-Bishop Thietmar of Merseburg recorded the first mention of a town as Zirwisti urbs in 1018, giving an account of the occupation by the Polish duke Bolesław I Chrobry during the German–Polish War with King Henry II in 1007. In the early 12th century the Ascanian ruler Albert the Bear had the fortress rebuilt, and the adjacent settlement was first fortified with town walls about 1250.

In 1307 Prince Albert I of Anhalt acquired the city of Zerbst from the Barby comital family, starting a centuries-long rule by the Ascanian princely House of Anhalt. His descendants continued to rule the Principality of Anhalt-Zerbst until in 1396 it was divided between Prince Sigismund I and his brother Albert IV, and the residence was moved to Dessau.

In 1375 Zerbster Bitterbier was first mentioned; by the Middle Ages the town had 600 breweries.

Following the Reformation Zerbst became a Calvinist centre. From 1582 to 1798 the Francisceum Gymnasium Illustre was an important Calvinist college. From 1603 to 1793 Zerbst again was the residence of the Anhalt-Zerbst princes, whose rule included among others also the Lordship of Jever in East Frisia. From 1722 to 1758, the Baroque composer Johann Friedrich Fasch resided there and was employed as a Hofkomponist and later Hofkapellmeister. To honour his memory, the Fasch Festivals have taken place in the city since 1983.

In 1745 Princess Sophie Auguste Friederike von Anhalt-Zerbst married Peter of Holstein-Gottorp, the heir apparent to the Russian throne. As Catherine II (the Great) she herself reigned as Empress of Russia from  until ).

In 1797 Zerbst became a component of the Principality of Anhalt-Dessau.

From 1891 to 1928 a horse-drawn streetcar was operated in Zerbst, one of the longest surviving among such streetcars in Germany.

In the later part of the Second World War a Nazi labour camp was established on the edge of the military airfield, housing so-called "First-degree Hybrids" and "Jüdisch Versippte" (i.e., people with some Jewish blood, enough in Nazi terms to justify badly mistreating them but not killing them outright). 700 inmates from there were used for hard labour in road and airport construction as well as peat digging.

On 16 April 1945 – just a few weeks before the final surrender of Nazi Germany – some eighty percent of Zerbst was destroyed in an Allied air raid.

The old town was rebuilt in the following decades resulting in a fundamental change of the townscape, as only a few historical structures were preserved or reconstructed.

On 1 July 2006, the town of Zerbst was renamed Zerbst/Anhalt. A year later, on 1 July 2007, the town of Zerbst/Anhalt was incorporated together with several other municipalities of the Zerbst administrative district, creating the renewed Anhalt-Bitterfeld administrative district with its capital at Köthen.

Local council
Elections in May 2014

Mayors
since July 2012: Andreas Dittmann (SPD)
1990-2012: Helmut Behrendt (FDP)

Notable people

Catherine the Great, (1729-1796), later Empress of Russia, lived at Zerbst Castle for some time
Peter Hagendorf, (exact life data unknown), mercenary in the Thirty Years' War, possibly born in Zerbst
Charles, Prince of Anhalt-Zerbst (1652–1718), ruling prince for 44 years
John Augustus, Prince of Anhalt-Zerbst (1677–1742), ruling prince
Johann Friedrich Fasch (1688-1758), composer
Carl Friedrich Christian Fasch (1736–1800), composer and harpsichordist
Heinrich Ritter (1791–1869), philosopher
Hermann Raster (1827-1891), editor and political figure
Jenny Hirsch (1829–1902), author and reformer
Paul Kummer (1834–1912), minister, teacher, and scientist
Karl Ludwig Schröder (1877-1940), screenwriter and film agent
Leopold Bürkner (1894-1975), Deputy Admiral in the Second World War, short-time head of protocol of the government of Karl Donitz in 1945
Siegfried Fink (1928–2006), percussionist, composer and professor
Detlef Raugust (born 1954), footballer
Ute Rührold (born 1954), luger
Uwe Ampler (born 1964), cyclist

See also

 Principality of Anhalt-Zerbst

References

External links

 
Anhalt-Bitterfeld
Fläming Heath
Holocaust locations in Germany
Duchy of Anhalt